Miskatonic U. Graduate Kit is an accessory published in 1987 by Chaosium for the horror role-playing game Call of Cthulhu.

Description
Miskatonic U. Graduate Kit is a boxed collection of "memorabilia" from the fictional Miskatonic University of H.P. Lovecraft's Cthulhu-mythos short stories. Designed by Sandy Petersen and Lynn Willis, the kit contains:
 badge blank and two identity cards
 some sheets of Miskatonic University letterhead
 souvenir placemat with maps of the university campuses
 diploma with cardboard frame
 library card
 cafeteria card
 parking decal
 rear window decal
 bumper sticker
 a booklet, "School of Medieval Metaphysics Class Catalog"

Reception
In the August 1987 edition of White Dwarf (Issue #92), Graeme Davis was not impressed with this "accessory", saying "nothing in the kit is the slightest use in the game." Davis also pointed out that the accessories were from the present day, and could not be used in the game, which was set in the 1920s. Davis gave this a thumbs down, saying "it smacks more of Abbott and Costello Meet Nyarlathotep to me."

In the November 1987 issue of Dragon (Issue #127), Ken Rolston noted that none of the components of this boxed set had any in-game application for either player or referee, and that it was "strictly for fans" of the Call of Cthulhu game; but as a self-admitted fan, he  admitted "I adore this".

Awards
Miskatonic U. Graduate Kit was awarded the Origins Award for "Best Graphic Presentation of a Roleplaying Game, Adventure, or Supplement of 1987".

Reviews
Challenge #34

References

Call of Cthulhu (role-playing game) supplements
Origins Award winners
Role-playing game supplements introduced in 1987